Vachagan Tovmasyan (born 7 July 1986)  known professionally as Vache Tovmasyan, is an Armenian actor, comedian, and showman. In 2005, Vache joined several other comedians—largely unknown to the public—to form 32 Teeth (32 ատամ) comedy show. In 2010 Vache and his friends created the Vitamin Club (Վիտամին ակումբ) stand-up comedy TV show, which was broadcast by Shant TV every week till 2016.

Filmography

References

External links

1986 births
Living people
Male actors from Yerevan
Armenian producers
Armenian male film actors
Armenian comedians